Aspen Magazine is a magazine in Aspen, Colorado, United States.

Overview
A local publication named Aspen, The Magazine, was founded in 1974. The founder was Ernie Ashley Goodnough. In 1987, Janet O'Grady and Randy Beier bought the company that owned Aspen, The Magazine, and folded the publication. The couple founded the publishing company Ridge Publications,  and they co-founded an entirely new title, copyrighting it Aspen Magazine, with both a local and national editorial direction, as well as advertising and circulation business model. The couple were the vision and the public faces of the brand and very active in the Aspen community. The magazine was known for its satirical Best of Aspen issues. The publication eventually evolved, along with the times, in to a luxury lifestyle magazine. Aspen Magazine'''s main themes were culture, fashion, cuisine, health, personalities, travel, luxury, sports, and nature. Randy Beier died of cancer in 2001. Janet O'Grady, who served as editor in chief from 1987 to 2013, sold the company in the end of 2012, and works as a writer and digital and social media expert.

As the magazine is an unaudited publication, its exact circulation cannot be verified. It once published six issues a year, in January, March, June, July, August, and December, but now only publishes four times a year. It also publishes a supplement, the Art Gallery Guide''.

References

External links
Homepage

Bimonthly magazines published in the United States
Lifestyle magazines published in the United States
Local interest magazines published in the United States
Quarterly magazines published in the United States
English-language magazines
Magazines established in 1974
Magazines published in Colorado